The Men’s 5000 metre relay in short track speed skating at the 2018 Winter Olympics took place on 13 and 22 February 2018 at the Gangneung Ice Arena in Gangneung, South Korea. The race was won by Hungary, this was Hungary's first ever Winter Olympics gold medal.

Records
Prior to this competition, the existing world and Olympic records were as follows.

Two Olympic records were set during the competition.

Results

Semifinals
The semifinals were held on 13 February.

 QA – qualified for Final A
 QB – qualified for Final B
 PEN – penalty

Finals

Final B (classification round)

Final A (medal round)
The final was held on 22 February.

References

Men's short track speed skating at the 2018 Winter Olympics